Terrazzo is a comune (municipality) in the Province of Verona in the Italian region Veneto, located about  southwest of Venice and about  southeast of Verona.

Terrazzo borders the following municipalities: Badia Polesine, Bevilacqua, Boschi Sant'Anna, Castagnaro, Castelbaldo, Legnago, Merlara, Urbana, and Villa Bartolomea.

People
Massimo Bubola (b. 1954), singer-songwriter

References

External links

 Terrazzo official website

Cities and towns in Veneto